Michael Dobson may refer to:

Michael Dobson (author) (born 1952), American author
Michael Dobson (businessman) (born 1952), British businessman, chairman of Schroders
Michael Dobson (actor) (born 1966), Canadian voice actor
Michael Dobson (footballer) (born 1981), English footballer
Michael Dobson (rugby league) (born 1986), Australian rugby league player